Homewood School District 153 is a school district headquartered inside James Hart Middle School in Homewood, Illinois in the Chicago metropolitan area.

Homewood-Flossmoor High School is separate, controlled by its own school district.

Schools
 Willow School (early childhood-grade 2)
 Winston Churchill School (grades 3–5)
 James Hart Middle School (grades 6–8)

References

External links
 

School districts in Cook County, Illinois